William Humphrey Foy (July 4, 1886 – May 2, 1956) was a college football player.

Alabama Polytechnic
Foy was a prominent  fullback for the Auburn Tigers of Alabama Polytechnic Institute.  The Auburn media guide also lists his position as a tackle.

1903
He was injured in the 1903 season, suffering a broken collarbone.

1904
He made the All-Southern team in 1904, Mike Donahue's first season as head coach. Auburn was the undefeated SIAA co-champion with Vanderbilt and its first year coach Dan McGugin. He was the second Auburn player ever selected All-Southern, behind only James Elmer.

References

1886 births
1956 deaths
People from Eufaula, Alabama
American football tackles
American football fullbacks
Auburn Tigers football players
All-Southern college football players
Players of American football from Alabama